List of the road churches in Finland in 2012

 

The meaning of the names are: kappeli, chapel; kirkko, church; tuomiokirkko, cathedral.

References

Finland